Rockyford Airport  is located  northeast of Rockyford, Alberta, Canada.

References

Registered aerodromes in Alberta
Wheatland County, Alberta